Åke Olof Sebastian Uddén (18 August 1903 in Lossa (now Låssa), Upplands-Bro Municipality, Stockholm County – 28 April 1987 in Stockholm) was a Swedish violist, composer, conductor and music educator.

Uddén studied in Stockholm with Henrik Melcher Melchers and Julius Ruthström, and subsequently from 1926 to 1928 with Georges Caussade and Charles Tournemire at the Conservatoire de Paris.

Uddén played viola in the Swedish Radio Symphony Orchestra from 1943 until 1956.  He was a teacher of counterpoint at the Royal College of Music from 1934 to 1970, and was also conductor of the Stockholm Academic Orchestra (1955–1985).

His limited output, influenced by French music, includes a number of orchestral, vocal and chamber music works, among them a string trio written during his studies in Paris, and two string quartets.

Selected works
Orchestral
 Nocturne
 Vår (Spring) for chamber orchestra
 Menuett (1932)
 Saraband
 Gavotte (1935)
 Lustspels-Uvertyr (Comic Overture) (1935, revised 1950)
 Introitus academicus (1971)

Chamber music
 String Trio (1928)
 Sonata in D major for flute and viola, Op.2 (1931)
 Duo "Småprat" (Small Talk) for 2 violas (1933)
 Sonatina for viola solo, Op. 3 (1933, revised 1986)
 String Quartet No. 1 (1940)
 String Quartet No. 2 (1956)

Vocal
 Är jag intill döden trött (I Am Tired unto Death) for voice and chamber orchestra (1930); words by Harriet Löwenhjelm
 En gammal vårvisa (An Old Spring Song) for 3 female voices and piano (1939)
 Midsommarvisa: Folkvisa från Västmanland (Folk Tune from Västmanland) for 3 female voices and piano (1939)
 Tre sånger ur Chansons de Bilitis (3 Songs from Chansons de Bilitis) for voice and piano (1941–1945); words by Pierre Louÿs
 Nocturne for tenor and piano (1946)

Sources
 Lönn, Anders, "Åke Uddén", in The New Grove Dictionary of Music and Musicians, 20 vols., ed. Stanley Sadie, London: Macmillan, 1980. .
 Swedish Music Information Centre: Åke Uddén biography

References

External links
 Åke Uddén at the Swedish Music Information Centre

1903 births
1987 deaths
20th-century classical composers
People from Upplands-Bro Municipality
Academic staff of the Royal College of Music, Stockholm
Swedish classical composers
Swedish male classical composers
Swedish classical violists
Swedish conductors (music)
Male conductors (music)
20th-century conductors (music)
20th-century Swedish male musicians
20th-century Swedish musicians
20th-century violists